The 1943–1945 Barzani revolt was a Kurdish nationalistic insurrection in the Kingdom of Iraq, during World War II. The revolt was led by Mustafa Barzani and was later joined by his older brother Ahmed Barzani, the leader of the previous Kurdish revolt in Iraq. The revolt, initiating in 1943, was eventually put down by the Iraqi assault in late 1945, combined with the defection of a number of Kurdish tribes. As a result, the Barzanis retreated with much of their forces into Iranian Kurdistan, joining the local Kurdish elements in establishing the Republic of Mahabad.

Background

Ahmed Barzani revolt was the first of the major Barzani revolts and the third Kurdish nationalistic insurrection in modern Iraq. The revolt began in 1931, after Ahmed Barzani, one of the most prominent Kurdish leaders in Southern Kurdistan, succeeded in unifying a number of other Kurdish tribes. The ambitious Kurdish leader enlisted a number of Kurdish leaders into the revolt, including his young brother Mustafa Barzani, who became one of the most notable commanders during this revolt. The Barzan forces were eventually overpowered by Iraqi Army with British support, forcing the leaders of Barzan to go underground.

After the 1931 events, Mulla Mustafa was reunited with Shaykh Ahmed Barzani as the Iraqi government arrested the brothers and exiled them to Mosul in 1933. The two Barzanis were transferred to various cities in Iraq throughout the 1930s and early 1940s. During this time their stops included Mosul, Baghdad, Nasiriya, Kifri, and Altin Kopru before finally ending in Sulaymaniya.  Meanwhile, back in Barzan, the remaining Barzani tribal fighters were faced with constant pressures of arrest or death.

WWII and the Kurdish insurrection

British occupation

As World War II began to occupy the attention of the world's nations, the Barzanis and their tribe were still internally separated and remained at odds with the Iraqi government. The British occupation of Iraq in 1941, presumably to ensure Iraqi compliance with the Allied cause would indirectly lead to a reunion between Mustafa Barzani and his people and again pose a challenge to Iraqi authority. In 1943, with inflation gripping Iraq and the British showing little concern about the Kurdish issue, the Barzani family found themselves unable to subsist on their meager government funds. Still in exile in Sulaymaniya, the Barzani financial situation became so dire the family resorted to selling their rifles and their gold jewelry. The indignation of having to part with their family fortune and their methods of self-defense led Mustafa Barzani to plot his return to Barzan.  The impetus for Barzani's return was strictly economic, not nationalist nor caused by a desire to counter any anti-British sentiment in Kurdistan, although Barzani did have contacts within Kurdish nationalist circles in Sulaymaniya, who may have aided him in his escape.

First phase of insurrection
After receiving permission from Shaykh Ahmad Barzani, Mulla Mustafa, along with two close associates, fled Sulaymaniya and crossed into Iran.  Once in the Iranian town of Shino, Barzani reunited with resettled members of the Barzani tribe and made his way to Barzan. Upon his return, Mulla Mustafa became "the immediate object of attention from his own followers, the chiefs of neighboring tribes, Iraqi government officials who wished to reintern him, and members of the Kurdish nationalist movement". This latter group included Mir Hajj Ahmad and Mustafa Krushnaw, Kurdish officers in the Iraqi army and members of Hiwa, an underground Kurdish nationalist movement.

Upon his return to Barzan, Mulla Mustafa recruited a force to challenge regional Iraqi authority. Numbering nearly 750 in only two weeks, Barzani fighters began small operations such as raiding police stations and frontier posts. These early raids demonstrated the growing military organization of Barzani's forces. Although still mostly tribal, enrollment in Barzani's force grew to nearly 2,000 within months as local Kurds, including those deserting the Iraqi army, joined the ranks.  In order to organize this growing force, Barzani created combat groups of 15-30 men; appointed Muhammad Amin Mirkhan, Mamand Maseeh, and Saleh Kaniya Lanji commanders; and instilled strict rules of soldierly conduct.

Throughout 1943, Barzani and his fighters seized police stations and re-supplied themselves with Iraqi arms and ammunition. Once levels of command were created, Barzani established his headquarters in Bistri, a village halfway between his Rawanduz and Barzan forces. Barzani's forces achieved victories in the Battle of Gora Tu and the Battle of Mazna. During these battles, Barzani forces were able to defeat trained, organized, and well-supplied Iraqi army units.

Diplomacy
Barzani petitioned the Iraqi government for autonomy as well as the release of Kurdish prisoners, including Shaykh Ahmed Barzani. Although the autonomy request was denied, the Iraqi government did negotiate with Barzani throughout the early 1940s. These negotiations led to the release of Shaykh Ahmed in early 1944. Due to Iraqi recognition and Barzani's wide influence and power, Kurdish patriots began to rally around Barzani, showing him their respect and turning him into the "national beacon of the Kurdish liberation movement".

Diplomacy between Mustafa Barzani and the Iraqi government began on a positive note, partially due to several Kurdish sympathizers within the Iraqi government. However, after the resignation of the Iraqi cabinet in 1944, a new ruling body took over, one far less willing to give into Kurdish aspirations. As a result, previous concessions were ignored and pro-Kurdish diplomats were dismissed, opening a new round of Iraqi–Kurdish hostilities.

With his position only strengthened by the previous administration, Mustafa Barzani continued his demands, while simultaneously preparing his forces for further military actions. Knowing the conflict was imminent, Barzani divided his forces into three fronts: a MargavarRawanduz front, commanded by former Iraqi official Mustafa Khoshnaw; an Imadia front, led by Izzat Abd al-Aziz; and an Aqra front, led by Sheikh Sulayman Barzani.  All elements would be accountable to Mustafa Barzani, the self-proclaimed "Commander-In-Chief of the Revolutionary Forces". Mustafa Barzani, with the approval of Shaykh Ahmad Barzani, also formed the Rizgari Kurd (the Kurdish Freedom Party) in early 1945. Consisting primarily of Kurdish officers, government officials, and professionals, Rizgari Kurd intended to unify the Kurds, establish autonomy or independence within Iraq, and continue to create armed units to defend Kurdistan.

Second phase (1945)
Despite Barzani's order to his military to "not initiate fighting", conflict re-erupted in August 1945 in the town of Margavar. This violence led to the death of prominent Kurd Wali Beg and several Iraqi police officers. As a result of Beg's demise, the Kurdish populace, without any military authorization, overran the police stations in Margavar and Barzan. Barzani quickly returned from arbitrating a local tribal dispute and took command of the revolt. Against British advice, the Iraqi government attempted to pacify the region, declaring martial law, threatening military action, and demanding Barzani's surrender. With diplomacy no longer an option, the Iraqis deployed numerous army units to the region to subdue the growing rebellion.

In preparation for the conflict, Mustafa Barzani met with Shaykh Ahmed Barzani to decide who should command the forces against the looming Iraqi threat.  The Barzanis decided that Mustafa Barzani himself should lead the Aqra force; Mohammad Siddique Barzani, brother of Shaykh Ahmed and Mulla Mustafa, would lead the Margavar-Rawanduz front; Haji Taha Imadi would lead the Balenda-Imadia front; and As’ad Khosavi was given the responsibility of both surrounding the Bilah garrison and supplying the forces of the Aqra front. With command in place, the Barzani forces were able to dominate the early battles.  The Iraqi army, attempting to seize the eastern slopes of Mount Qalandar, was driven back to the Gali Ali Beg Gorge.  Although victorious, the Barzani forces did sustain numerous losses, including a serious injury to Commander Mohammad Siddique Barzani.

On 4 September 1945 the Iraqi assault continued, as army units from Aqra and Rawanduz and a police unit from Amadia were deployed towards Barzan. A few days later in the Battle of Maidan Morik, Barzani fighters once again held their own against Iraqi mechanized and artillery batteries.  As the battles degenerated to hand-to-hand combat, the Iraqi army, presumably losing command and control, was forced to retreat temporarily from the region. While Iraqi ground forces withdrew, the air raids kept on going.

Despite the early Barzani victories, by the end of September 1945 the Iraqi government turned the tide of the conflict, convincing regional tribes to oppose the Barzanis and aid in suppressing the revolt. These tribal fighters, including members of the Zibrari, Berwari, and Doski tribes, and elements of the Muhajarin, loyal to several of the sons of Sayyid Taha of Shemdinan, attacked Barzani and his men, uprooting them from their "defensive strongholds" and preventing them from further attacking Iraqi troops in the region. These "treasonous" assaults, combined with the Iraqi occupation of Barzan on 7 October, forced Barzani to order his forces to retreat from the region and cross into Iranian Kurdistan.  Once there, the Barzani family and their supporters settled in various towns in the Mahabad area, joining the local Kurdish nationalist elements.

Aftermath

The Mahabad Republic stands as the high point of the Kurdish nationalist movement. This short period of national identity marked the official creation of the peshmerga and cemented the role of Mustafa Barzani as a military hero of the Kurdish people. During the short life of this nation-state, the idea of a Kurdish homeland finally came into being. Unfortunately for the Kurds, the Republic lasted only 12 months, from December 1945 to December 1946.

Following the failure of the Kurdish nation-state in Iran, Mustafa Barzani and his men retreated towards Iraq and eventually found refuge in the Soviet Union, where the Kurds were given sanctuary by the Soviets. Only in late 1950s, Mustafa Barzani would begin a process of reconciliation with the Iraqi government—which would, however, fail, and the Iraqi–Kurdish conflict would re-erupt into its most violent phase from 1961.

See also
 Iraqi Kurdistan
 Kurds
 List of modern conflicts in the Middle East

References

Kurdish rebellions in Iraq
1943 in Iraq
1944 in Iraq
1945 in Iraq
1945 in Iran
Conflicts in 1943
Conflicts in 1944
Conflicts in 1945